Francisco González and Matt Mitchell were the defending champions, but González did not compete this year. Mitchell teamed up with John Lloyd and lost in the second round to Mark Edmondson and Kim Warwick.

Stefan Edberg and Anders Järryd won the title by defeating Joakim Nyström and Mats Wilander 4–6, 6–2, 6–3 in the final.

Seeds

Draw

Finals

Top half

Bottom half

References

External links
 Official results archive (ATP)
 Official results archive (ITF)

1985 Grand Prix (tennis)